Lawrence Hogan Mize (born September 23, 1958) is an American professional golfer who played on the PGA Tour and currently plays on the Champions Tour. He is well known for one career-defining shot – a chip from off the green at the 11th hole at Augusta to win the playoff for the 1987 Masters Tournament, which is his only major title to date. He is also the only winner of that tournament to come from Augusta.

Biography
Mize was born in Augusta, Georgia, and worked during his teenage years at the Masters Tournament as a scoreboard operator on the 3rd hole. He attended Georgia Tech.

Mize turned professional in 1980. He finished in the top 125 on the money list (the level needed to retain membership of the tour) for 20 seasons from 1982 to 2001. His first PGA Tour win was the 1983 Danny Thomas Memphis Classic. In 1986, at the Kemper Open, Mize lost a six-hole playoff to Greg Norman.

At the 1987 Masters, Mize was tied with Seve Ballesteros and Norman after four rounds. Ballesteros was eliminated in the first hole of the playoff after missing a 5-footer for par.  On the second playoff hole, Augusta's Par-4 11th, Mize's second shot landed well to the right of the green.  It appeared a birdie would be impossible and even a par would be a challenge.  Meanwhile, Norman's second shot landed on the edge of the green leaving him a lengthy birdie putt.  On his third shot, Mize holed a memorable chip shot with a sand wedge from around 140 feet, giving him the birdie. Norman now had an opportunity to tie, but he failed to sink the putt. His Masters win and a tie for fourth at the U.S. Open in June briefly put him in the top-10 of the Official World Golf Ranking.

Mize won twice more on the PGA Tour, at tournaments in Tucson, Arizona, in 1993, at the Northern Telecom Open, and at the Buick Open in Flint, Michigan, also in 1993. He also won on the Champions Tour victory in 2010, in Montreal.

Mize also won four international events and played for the U.S. teams in the Ryder Cup in 1987 and the Dunhill Cup in 2000. 

For many years Mize and Coca-Cola sponsored a successful charity golf tournament to benefit cystic fibrosis held at the Atlanta Athletic Club. Mize currently resides in Columbus, Georgia with his wife and three sons.  His hobbies are fishing, basketball, and playing the piano. As of April 2022, he has played in 39 consecutive Masters Tournaments, 34 of which have been since earning a lifetime invitation because of his 1987 win.

Professional wins (10)

PGA Tour wins (4)

PGA Tour playoff record (1–3)

Japan Golf Tour wins (3)

Other wins (2)
 1993 Johnnie Walker World Golf Championship (unofficial event)
 2000 Straight Down Fall Classic (with Jim Lehman)

Champions Tour wins (1)

Major championships

Wins (1)

1Defeated Norman and Ballesteros in a sudden-death playoff: Mize (4-3), Norman (4-x) and Ballesteros (5).

Results timeline
Results not in chronological order in 2020.

CUT = missed the half-way cut (3rd round cut in 1984 Open Championship)
"T" indicates a tie for a place
NT = No tournament due to COVID-19 pandemic

Summary

 Most consecutive cuts made – 11 (1984 PGA – 1987 Open Championship)
 Longest streak of top-10s – 2 (1987 Masters – 1987 U.S. Open)

Results in The Players Championship

CUT = missed the halfway cut
"T" indicates a tie for a place

Results in senior major championships
Results not in chronological order before 2022.

CUT = missed the half-way cut
WD = withdrew
"T" indicates a tie for a place
NT = No tournament due to COVID-19 pandemic

U.S. national team appearances
Professional
 Ryder Cup: 1987
 Alfred Dunhill Cup: 2000

See also 

 Fall 1981 PGA Tour Qualifying School graduates

References

External links
 
 
 

American male golfers
Georgia Tech Yellow Jackets men's golfers
PGA Tour golfers
PGA Tour Champions golfers
Ryder Cup competitors for the United States
Winners of men's major golf championships
Golfers from Augusta, Georgia
Sportspeople from Columbus, Georgia
1958 births
Living people